Riders Republic is a sports video game developed by Ubisoft Annecy and published by Ubisoft. The game was released for PlayStation 4, PlayStation 5, Amazon Luna, Stadia, Windows, Xbox One, and Xbox Series X/S on October 28, 2021.

Gameplay
The four main activities available in the game include mountain biking, skiing, snowboarding, and wingsuit flying. Ubisoft described the game as a "massively multiplayer sports game", as up to 64 players can compete against each other in Mass Races competitions. The PS4 and Xbox One versions only support about 20 players. In addition, players can also play a 6v6 competitive multiplayer mode named "Tricks Battle Arena". In this mode, each team competes in an arena and needs to perform as many tricks as possible in order to score Trick points. The team with the highest score is the winner. The game is set in an open world which meshes seven distinct national parks in the Western United States, namely Bryce Canyon, Yosemite Valley, Sequoia Park, Zion, Canyonlands, Mammoth Mountain, and Grand Teton, into one enormous single map. The game features social hubs in which players can meet and interact with each other.

The game features a career mode, in which players engage in six different disciplines (Bike Freestyle, Bike Racing, Snowboard/Ski Freestyle, Snowboard/Ski Racing, Wingsuit, Rocket Wingsuit). Each of them has its own progression path. Gradually, players would reach important milestones, such as being invited to join competitions like UCI Mountain Bike World Cup, Red Bull Rampage, Red Bull Joyride and the X Games, and signing with real-world sports sponsors. The final objective is to participate in "Riders Ridge Invitational", described as "a never seen before multi-sport competition featuring all sports in one single event". In this event, players can switch between the sport activities at will. As players progress in the career mode, they will unlock new gears, outfits and cosmetic items.

Development
The game is currently being developed by Ubisoft Annecy using Ubisoft's proprietary game engine Ubisoft Anvil, from the team that created Steep, also an extreme sports game, in 2016. Development of the game started in 2017, and the development team expanded to include members from other Ubisoft's studios in Montpellier, Belgrade, Pune, Berlin, Kyiv, and Odesa. The development team recreated the national parks using GPS data, and even though the seven national parks are distinct regions in real life, the team integrated the parks together in order to create one single open world for players to explore. The American national parks were chosen as the game's setting as they are often used to host competitions for extreme sports. The studio also sent a team to visit these parks to ensure that they are accurately represented in the game. 

Like Steep, the game is not a simulation video game, as the team designed the gameplay to be as accessible as possible. The team worked with experts and athletes to ensure that each activity featured is authentic. For instance, different bike brands have stats that would "mimic real life behaviour". The gameplay was designed to be a social game which emphasizes "excitement and camaraderie of online community". This decision was made after Steep was offered as a free game for PlayStation Plus members in early 2019, which went on to attract more than 10 million new players.

Riders Republic was announced on September 10, 2020 during the Ubisoft Forward digital event. The game was set to be released on February 25, 2021, but it was delayed by Ubisoft in January 2021. The game was then set to be released on September 2, 2021, but was delayed to October 28. Players who pre-ordered the game would receive the  Bunny Pack, which adds additional cosmetic items into the game. The game would be supported extensively with post-launch downloadable content. It was released for Windows, PlayStation 4, PlayStation 5, Stadia, Xbox One and Xbox Series X on October 28, 2021.

Reception 

Riders Republic received "generally favourable" reviews, according to review aggregator Metacritic. Game Informer awarded the game a 6.75, outlining that "Even though I liked the racing in Riders Republic, overall, I can't say I enjoyed my time with it. It's a missed opportunity of a game, focusing on all the wrong things, making for an experience worth skipping."

Other reviewers were much more positive in nature, such as GamesRadar, saying it "prioritizes fun, freedom, and community".

Awards and accolades
The game was nominated for Best Sports/Racing Game at The Game Awards 2021.

Notes

References

External links
 

2021 video games
Cycling video games
Multiple-sport video games
Open-world video games
PlayStation 4 games
PlayStation 5 games
Skiing video games
Snowboarding video games
Stadia games
Ubisoft games
Video games developed in France
Video games postponed due to the COVID-19 pandemic
Video games set in the United States
Video games with downloadable content
Windows games
Xbox One games
Xbox Series X and Series S games